Vladimir Bouchler is a theatre director, film director and pedagogue of acting and directing in theatre and film.

Biography
After starting life as an electric engineer in Soviet Union's Republic of Uzbekistan, Vladimir headed to The Ostrovsky Theatre School in Tashkent to study for five years as an actor. This was followed by a further five years training and practice as a director in the Boris Shchukin Theatre Institute MA, in Moscow. Since then Vladimir has worked as an independent director, worldwide.

Professional life

ADMINISTRATIVE AND ACADEMIC POSITIONS

  Artistic director of the International Festival "Week of Theatre Methods" (Brussels)
  Artistic director, producer of the European Theatre and Film Institute
  Professor, Head of acting department, MTHS The Norwegian College of Musical Theatre (Norway)
  CEO of Saraton International Street Theatre and Film Festival in Tashkent (Uzbekistan)

Theatre professor
1999–2022
 Guest Professor of MA Creative Practices & Direction in Guildford School of Acting, Guildford, UK
 Guest Professor of Directing department in Central Academy of Drama, Beijing, China
 Professor of acting department School of Musical Theatre, Oslo, Norway, Musikkteaterhøyskolen
 Workshop leader, Music Theatre Master ArtEZ Institute of the Arts Arnhem, Netherlands
 Workshop leader in ÉCOLE SUPÉRIEURE DES ARTS ACADEMY OF ARTS, Mons, Belgium 
 Research leader of Educational Theatre Research Project,  aiming at practical analysis of the interlingual, multicultural, interdisciplinary approach in contemporary theatre making (conditional title: ”Het doorbreken van de muur”) in School of Arts | Koninklijk Conservatorium Brussel, Belgium 
 Lecturer of acting in the Opera Department of Folkwang University of the Arts
 Lecturer of acting in the Opera Department of Royal Conservatory of Brussels
 Guest Professor of BA Drama in University of Manchester, UK
 Lecturer of acting in non-naturalistic performance styles University of Salford, UK 
 Lecturer of film directing/acting Manchester Metropolitan University, UK 
 Professor of directing School of stage design La Cambre Brussels
 Professor of acting in the Theatre Conservatory of Bordeaux, France
 Professor of acting in the circus school of Belgium
 Leader of the yearly Chekhov’s intensive workshop Drama Department University of Wales
 Master of Chekhov’s Creative Theatre Atelier in Brussels (Belgium)
 Screen Academy Mentor in the University of Wales, Newport
 Leader of the intensive acting course Deutsches Zentrum für Schauspiel Cologne
 Master of acting course ArtEZ Theatre school Arnhem NL
 Guest professor / director KHiO Theatre School Oslo Norway
 Guest professor Musik og Teaterhøjskolen, Denmark
 Guest professor LASALLE College of the Arts, Singapore
 Guest professor USM, Penang, The School of Communication's/ Malaysia
 Guest professor ASWARA Film Faculty/Malaysia/ Kuala Lumpur
 Guest professor Chulalongkorn University, The Faculty of Communication Arts/Bangkok Thailand
 Guest professor Aalborg University Department of Communication /Denmark
 Guest professor Bristol Old Vic Theatre School/ UK
 Guest professor University of Tampa Film and Media Arts Department, Florida/ USA
 Guest professor Coastal Carolina University Departmentof Theatre, SC/ USA
 Workshop leader Cygnet New Theatre, Exeter UK
 Workshop leader Omma Studio and school, Crete, Greece

Theatre director
1979–2022 selected titles 
 
 "Pendulum" – musical creation based on short stories of O' Henry (Tashkent, Uzbekistan)
 "Attention, spring!" – by A. Chekhov (Tashkent, Uzbekistan)
 "Ring around the moon" – by J. Anouilh (Tashkent, Uzbekistan)
 "Escape Attempt" – on the base of science fiction novel of brothers Strugatsky; the show was set as a synthesis of modern ballet, dramatic theatre and modern visual effects.
 "The Five" – by A. Obraztsov, performance dedicated to World War II
 "Poor Soso Jugashvilly" – by V. Korkia (Tashkent, Uzbekistan)
 "Dialogues" – five one act plays of "new wave" playwrights from Russia (Tashkent, Uzbekistan)
 "The Devil in Love" – by N. Sadur (Tashkent, Uzbekistan)
 Vassa Zheleznova by M. Gorky (Tashkent, Uzbekistan)
 "Nothing" – an improvisation show (Besançon, France)
 "H2O and 4 women", modern ritual show has toured Europe and Asia and was presented more than 100 times in front of the international public. 
 "Children of October" (Grenoble, France)
 "Quai Ouest" – by B.–M. Koltes (Belgium)
 "7 wife’s of Blue Beard" – by A. Volodine (Belgium)
 "All at once" – by Y. Grishkovetz (UK, Belgium)
 "Galleries" by J. Hewitt (London, UK)
 "Ordinary miracle" by E. Shvarts (Iceland)
 "Three sisters" by A. Chekhov (Aberystwyth, Wales)
 "The Elder Son" by A. Vampilov (Manchester, UK)
 "Man without purpose" by A. Lygre (Stavanger, Norway)
 "Closer" by P. Marber (KHiO, Oslo, Norway)
 The Cherry Orchard by A. Chekhov (Dundee Rep, Scotland)
 "Invisible theatre babylon" – creation project in theatre and film
 "Uncle Vanya"  – Beaivváš Sámi Theatre, Norway
 "The Foreigner" by Larry Shue, NSKI, Oslo, Norway
 "Side by Side by Sondheim" by Stephen Sondheim, MTHS, Oslo, Norway
 Oklahoma! by Oscar Hammerstein II and Richard Rodgers, Galati, Romania; MTHS, Oslo, Norway
 "Moliere. Moliere" creation based on the extracts of Molière comedies, Ateliers ULB, Brussels, Belgium
 "Briser Le Mur!" creation based on three-lingual acting collaboration between three communities in Belgium, Espace Senghor, Brussels, Belgium 
 "The Final Circle of Paradise" – based on science fiction novel of brothers Strugatsky (ETFI, Brussels)

Special projects
1991–present

 Leader of the Aral Sea project – project designed to draw world attention to the problem of the Aral Sea using theatre, cinema, TV, and photographic exhibitions (in France, Germany, Italy, Denmark, Sweden, the United Kingdom, Spain, Portugal, Poland, Switzerland, Turkey, Kazakhstan and Uzbekistan). The street theatre performance "H2O+4women" and video action, including the documentary film "Dry Tears. Aral Sea Legend" were created with the participation of Emma Thompson, Annie Girardot, Erland Josephson, Michel Crespin, Timur Bekmambetov and others.
2016–present
 Co-founder of European Theatre and Film Institute      
 Co-founder of Brussels Cinema Lab
1991–1998
 Director of "Children of October", creation, toured 12 countries, dedicated to the disappearance of the USSR. It was created with the use of 100,000 "Oktyabr icons" (badges with the image of Lenin-child, worn by children in the USSR)
1995–1999
 Director of "GAIA", creation, toured 7 countries. In Greek mythology, Gaia is the personification of the Earth. The play was performed with soil, brought to Europe from 15 republics of the former Soviet Union. The actors performed people who suddenly lost their homeland due to various national conflicts.
1989–1994
 CEO of Saraton Theatre and Film Festival in Tashkent (Uzbekistan)

Film director/actor
 1991 "Mission N1" – creative documentary with participation of Erland Josephson (lead actor of Ingmar Bergman, Peter Brook)
 1998 "Dry Tears" documentary legend (with narration of Emma Thompson) – director, cinematographer "Les Larmes Sèches" with narration of Annie Girardot
 2004 "CO/MA" actor in Mike Figgis & European Film Academy project

Professional education

Theatre and film acting
Tashkent State Institute for Dramatic Art

Theatre directing
 Boris Shchukin Theatre Institute (Moscow)

Film directing and acting
course "Six Actors In Search Of A Director" – workshop by Krzysztof Kieślowski in Amsterdam  1994
acting in Mike Figgis & European Film Academy project "CO/MA" How to Combine Vision And Craft And Make a Film in One Week  2004
Anthony Dod Mantle (EFA) master class in Berlin "Developing a Personal Visual Dictionary" 2005
Stefan Jarl (EFA) master class in Brandenburg July 2006

References

External links 
 https://www.youtube.com/watch?v=vuFrFk4Bsvg

1954 births
Living people
Mass media people from Tashkent
Uzbekistani theatre directors